Mario Fafangel (19 December 1914 – 11 February 2007) was a Slovenian sailor. He competed at the 1952 Summer Olympics and the 1960 Summer Olympics. In 2013, he was inducted into the Slovenian Athletes Hall of Fame.

His grandson, Mario Fafangel (Jr.) is a medical doctor - epidemiologist.

References

External links
 

1914 births
2007 deaths
Slovenian male sailors (sport)
Olympic sailors of Yugoslavia
Sailors at the 1952 Summer Olympics – Star
Sailors at the 1960 Summer Olympics – Star
People from Rab
20th-century Slovenian people